Virgil Mazilescu (born 11 April 1942, Corabia, Olt County, Romania — died 10 August 1984, Bucharest, Romania) was a Romanian poet, essayist and translator.

Life 
After finishing the "Spiru Haret” High School in Bucharest in 1957, he enrolled in the Department of Romanian Language and Literature of the University of Bucharest, from where he graduated in 1964. After stints as a school teacher and as a librarian, he worked from 1970 until his death as a copy editor for România literară. For a few years he was the secretary of the Romanian Writers' Union's literary circle, led by Miron Radu Paraschivescu.

A bohemian, who was also known for his heavy drinking, he died on August 10, 1984.

Literary activity 
In 1966 he made his literary debut in "Povestea vorbei”, the monthly avantgarde literary supplement of the magazine Ramuri from Craiova, edited by Miron Radu Paraschivescu.

Books 
Versuri, București, Editura pentru Literatură, 1968
Fragmente din regiunea de odinioară, București, Editura Cartea Românească, 1970
Va fi liniște, va fi seară, București, Editura Cartea Românească, 1979
Guillaume poetul și administratorul, București, Editura Cartea Românească, 1983

Posthumously 
Asketische Zeichen. Gedichte, Cluj, Editura Dacia, 1988, 2001
Întoarcerea lui Immanuel, București, Editura Albatros, 1991
Poezii, București, Editura Vitruviu, 1996
Opere complete, editor: Alexandru Condeescu, București, Editura Muzeul Literaturii Române, 2003
Opera poetica, editor: Gabriel Nedelea, Craiova, Editura AIUS, 2013

Translations
He translated works by, among others, Jean Amila, Jack Schaefer, Fernand Fournier-Aubry, Henri Delacroix, Charles Portis and Willa Cather.

Awards
"Luceafărul” Magazine Award, 1968, for Versuri

Legacy
A school in his home town is named after him.

References 
Aurel Sasu, Dicționarul biografic al literaturii române (M-Z), Paralela 45, Pitești, 2006, pp. 68, 69
Dinu Flămând, Intimitatea textului, București, Editura Eminescu, 1985, pp. 162 – 176
Ion Buzera, Virgil Mazilescu, Brașov, Editura Aula, 2000

External links 
Gazeta de Sud - 22 de ani de la moartea poetului Virgil Mazilescu 
Centrul Cultural Pitești - Virgil Mazilescu 
Cum trebuie citit Virgil Mazilescu (şi cum este el editat) 

1942 births
1984 deaths
20th-century Romanian poets
Romanian male poets
Romanian essayists
Romanian translators
People from Corabia
20th-century translators
Male essayists
20th-century essayists
20th-century Romanian male writers